II Mundialito de Seniors (also known as I Copa Pelé) was the second World Cup of Masters. This was an unsanctioned tournament, and players were not recognised with international caps. It was held, again, in January 1989 in Brazil. In this tournament there were six "Senior" teams, hosts Brazil, reigning champions Argentina, Italy, West Germany, Uruguay and for the only time a team representing Great Britain. The tournament pitted all teams against each other in a League, with the top two teams then playing each other in the final. Brazil won the event beating Uruguay 4-2 in the final.

Results

Group table

Final

Goal scorers

7 goals
  Cláudio Adão

Champion

References

World Cup of Masters events
1989
1989 in Brazilian football
1989 in Uruguayan football
1988–89 in Argentine football
1988–89 in German football
1988–89 in Italian football
1988–89 in English football